James Garfield Beck (1881 - 1969) was an educator, coach, postal clerk, socialite, and community leader in Knoxville, Tennessee. He graduated from Knoxville College.

Beck was born in Alabama and named for United States President James Garfield.

Beck became the first African American postal clerk in Tennessee. He and his wife Ethel B. Beck (1897 - 1970) helped establish the Ethel Beck Home for Colored Orphans in 1919.

References

1881 births
1969 deaths